The Chinese Elm cultivar Ulmus parvifolia 'Red Fall' is an American clone selected by S. Bieberich of the Sunshine Nursery, Clinton, Oklahoma.

Description
As the name implies, the tree is distinguished by the intense red colouration of its foliage in autumn.

Pests and diseases
The species and its cultivars are highly resistant, but not immune, to Dutch elm disease, and unaffected by the Elm Leaf Beetle Xanthogaleruca luteola.

Cultivation
'Red Fall' is not known to be in cultivation beyond North America.

Synonymy
Ulmus 'Red': Anon.

Accessions
None known.

References

Chinese elm cultivar
Ulmus articles missing images
Ulmus